Mazurkas, Op. 59 are a set of three Mazurkas for solo piano by Frédéric Chopin. The set was composed and published in 1845.

Analysis

Mazurka in A minor, Op. 59, No. 1

Mazurka in A minor is the opening piece of the set. This highly chromatic Mazurka conveys a warm and comforting portrait, and concludes with an ascending melody.

Mazurka in A-flat major, Op. 59, No. 2

Mazurka in A-flat major is the second and shortest of the Op. 59 mazurkas, with a typical performance lasting around 2 and a half minutes.

The piece begins with a memorable main theme that Chopin varies from time to time to maintain the piece's interest. The trio section of the piece is very similar to the main theme, providing little contrast. The piece concludes with an interesting coda, full of accidentals and chromatic harmonies and finishing on a tonic chord, repeated 4 times.

Mazurka in F-sharp minor, Op. 59, No. 3

Mazurka in F-sharp minor, the final piece of the set, is referring to an oberek, a national Polish dance much faster than a mazurka. The piece begins with a memorable and powerful melody, the second theme is somewhat more joyful than the first. The left hand accompaniment of the piece experiments with descending chromatic harmonies, although this does not affect the melody which remains defined throughout the piece.

An autograph manuscript housed at the Morgan Library & Museum in New York contains a complete draft of this Mazurka written in the key of G minor, dedicated to Ferdinand Hiller.

References

External links
[ Mazurkas Op. 59 at Allmusic]
 
Chopin Institute – Op.59 No.1
Chopin Institute – Op.59 No.2
Chopin Institute – Op.59 No.3

1845 compositions
Mazurkas by Frédéric Chopin
Stefan Zweig Collection
Compositions in A minor
Compositions in A-flat major
Compositions in F-sharp minor